Actinostoloidea is a superfamily of sea anemones in the order Actiniaria.

Families in the superfamily Actinostoloidea include:
 Actinostolidae
 Halcampulactidae

References

 
Enthemonae
Animal superfamilies